The 2019 American Athletic Conference Football Championship Game was a college football game played on December 7, 2019, at Liberty Bowl Memorial Stadium in Memphis, Tennessee, to determine the 2019 champion of the American Athletic Conference. The conference's 5th championship game featured the champion of its East Division, the Cincinnati Bearcats, against the West Division champion, the Memphis Tigers. The game was televised on ABC.

The game is hosted by the divisional champion with the better winning percentage in conference games. Memphis claimed hosting rights with a 34–24 home win over Cincinnati to close out the regular season on November 29. This left both teams with a 7–1 conference record, with Memphis holding the tiebreaker due to the Tigers' head-to-head win. Navy ultimately tied Memphis for the West Division crown, but the Tigers also held that tiebreaker due to a head-to-head win.

Teams

Cincinnati
The Cincinnati Bearcats clinched the AAC East, and a berth in the Championship Game, with a win over Temple on November 23. This is Cincinnati's first Championship Game appearance.

Memphis
Memphis clinched at least a share of the West Division title with their November 29 win over Cincinnati, and also claimed hosting rights by virtue of holding all possible tiebreakers.

Game summary

Statistics

References

External links
Memphis game notes

Championship
American Athletic Conference Football Championship Game
Cincinnati Bearcats football games
Memphis Tigers football games
December 2019 sports events in the United States
2019 in sports in Tennessee